Dobromil or Dobromił (Polish) - is a Slavic origin given name meaning: dobro - "good, goodness" and mil/mił - "love, to like, dear". The feminine form is Dobromila/Dobromiła.

List of people with the given name Dobromil/Dobromila
 Magdalena Dobromila Rettigová, a Czech cookbook author

See also
 Dobroslaw (name)
 Dobromil (disambiguation)

External links
 http://www.behindthename.com/name/dobromil

Slavic masculine given names
Czech masculine given names